Baan is an Ogoni language of Nigeria.

References

Indigenous languages of Rivers State
Ogoni languages